Miguel Hernández Sánchez (born 19 February 1970 in Madrid), sometimes known as justMiguel, is a Spanish retired footballer who played as a central defender.

Miguel played in four La Liga seasons during his ten-year professional career, spending two years apiece with Rayo Vallecano and RCD Espanyol. He was part of Spain's gold medal-winning squad at the 1992 Summer Olympics, in Barcelona.

References

External links

1970 births
Living people
Footballers from Madrid
Spanish footballers
Association football defenders
La Liga players
Segunda División players
Segunda División B players
Rayo Vallecano players
RCD Espanyol footballers
UD Salamanca players
UE Lleida players
Terrassa FC footballers
Spain under-23 international footballers
Olympic footballers of Spain
Footballers at the 1992 Summer Olympics
Olympic medalists in football
Medalists at the 1992 Summer Olympics
Olympic gold medalists for Spain
Spanish football managers